Hopen or Höpen may refer to:

Hopen (Svalbard), an island
Hopen, Møre og Romsdal, a village in Smøla Municipality, Norway
Hopen, Nordland, a village in Vågan municipality, Norway
Hopen Church, in Hopen, Møre og Romsdal, Norway
Hopen Radio, a radio station in Svalbard, Norway
Höpen Airfield, near Schneverdingen, Germany

Persons with the surname Hopen
Ørjan Hopen, Norwegian footballer